{{Infobox artist
| name        = Carl Reinhardt
| image       = Das Schiff (Reinhardt).jpg
| caption     = The Ship, Illustration by Carl Reinhardt in To America! by Friedrich Gerstäcker
| birth_date   = 
| birth_place    = Leipzig, Germany
| death_date   = 1877
| death_place  = Radebeul, Germany
| nationality = German
| field       = painting, drawing, writing, caricature
| training    = Johan Christian Dahl, Albert Zimmermann
| works       = The Fifth of May, 1866-1868 
From Hamburg to Heligoland, 1959
Schultze and Müller at the Paris World Fair", 1867 Talking Animals, 1854 Tin-the-hohn-se, a natural history of white slaves, 1878 
various others
}}

Carl August Reinhardt (also referred to as Karl Reinhardt; born 25. April 1818 in Leipzig, Germany; died 11. August 1877 in Radebeul, Germany) was a German author, painter, graphic artist, and caricaturist.

Life

Reinhardt studied art in Leipzig, Dresden, and Munich, under the tutelage of Johan Christian Dahl and Albert Zimmermann, among others. During the 1840s and 1850s, he lived a bohemian wandering life as a landscape painter, author, and caricaturist. During this time, he contributed to the well-known magazines Kladderadatsch, Die Gartenlaube, and Illustrirte Zeitung.

In 1848, Reinhardt contributed to the Fliegende Blätter, in an issue titled "Meister Lapp and his apprentice Pips." The original issue was incomplete, and a complete version appeared in an 1851 book version published by Braun & Schneider. Reinhardt helped pioneer the comics genre in Deutscher Bilderbogen für Jung und Alt, which was inspired by the Munich Bilderbogen.

Reinhardt made his living illustrating books. Some of his best-known lithographs appear in volumes 2-4 of To America! by Friedrich Gerstäcker, published in 1855.

By the 1860s, Reinhardt had made a name for himself, but years of hard living had taken a toll on his health. Ill and still poor, he moved to Dresden and tried his hand at being an author, playwright, and journal editor (Der Calculator an der Elbe). In 1877, he opened an eponymous tavern in Radebeul. The tavern survived  Reinhardt's death, known under the abbreviated name "Zum Calculator."

Work

Monographs
 Der fünfte May. Wigand, Leipzig 1866-1868.
 Von Hamburg nach Helgoland. Broschek, Hamburg 1959.
 Schultze und Müller auf der Weltausstellung in Paris. Schäfers, Leipzig 1867
 Sprechende Tiere. 1854., reprint Glassbrenner, Adolf. Carlsen, Kopenhagen 1966
 TIN-THE-HOHN-TSE. Naturgeschichte der weissen Sclaven. Bruchmann, Stuttgart 1878

Fliegende Blätter
 172 (1848): Meister Lapp und sein Lehrjunge PipsDeutsche Bilderbogen Nr. 7: Lob der edlen Musica Nr. 8: Grad aus dem Wirthshaus Nr. 39: Der Hase in der Stadt Nr. 52: Eine Morithat Nr. 96: Ein Sonntagsvergnügen Nr. 137: Der Bauer in der Stadt Nr. 156: Im schwarzen Wallfisch zu Askalon Nr. 165: Ein harter VaterReferences

 Bernd Dolle-Weinkauff: Die Bildgeschichten des Carl August Reinhardt. In: Eckart Sackmann u.a. (Hrsg.): Deutsche Comicforschung 2''. Edition Sackmann & Hörndl, Hildesheim 2005, .

External links
 
 
 
 Lambiek Comiclopedia article.

1818 births
1877 deaths
German comics artists
German caricaturists
German illustrators
German male painters
19th-century German dramatists and playwrights
19th-century German male writers
19th-century German painters
19th-century German male artists
German landscape painters